Rúben Filipe Costa Rodrigues (born 2 June 1987) is a Portuguese footballer who plays for Aljustrelense as a forward.

Club career
He made his professional debut in the Segunda Liga for Santa Clara on 18 February 2007 in a game against Feirense.

References

External links

Soccerway profile

1987 births
People from Ponta Delgada
Living people
Portuguese footballers
Association football forwards
C.D. Santa Clara players
Liga Portugal 2 players
S.C. Praiense players
Segunda Divisão players